is a promotional manga series released alongside the Japanese release of the Superior Defender Gundam Force anime. It presents untold stories of the main cast, set before and during the story seen within the show.

Stories

Captain Gundam
After training breaks for the day, Shute and Captain receive word from Blanc Base of a Dark Axis plot at the Neotopia airport to seize planes using Control Horns. Captain, Shute and Gunbike attempt to fight off Zapper Zaku and his Zako Soldiers, but are overwhelmed by their numbers. Bakunetsumaru and Zero arrive and the battle soon turns in the Gundam Force's favour. With Shute powering his Soul Drive, Captain uses Gunbike to soar through the air and snipe the last Control Horn on top of a rampaging plane and save the day.

Bakunetsumaru
Shute admires one of Bakunetsumaru's swords and notices a crack in the scabbard. Bakunetsumaru reveals how it got there, retelling the tale of his final duel with his former friend Kujakumaru. Kujakumaru had attempted to shatter one of Bakunetsumaru's swords but succeeded only in damaging the scabbard. He was further humiliated when Bakunetsumaru's superior reflexes left him unable to land a single blow. As per tradition, Kujakumaru waited for his friend to give him an honorable death for losing the duel but out of respect Bakunetsumaru would not kill him. Far from thankful, Kujakumaru saw this as the final insult. Bakunetsumaru took his leave, unaware his former friend would ally with enemy warlord Kibaomaru in order to gain revenge.

Zapper Zaku
Set in the past before Zapper, Grappler and Destroyer held commanding ranks in the Dark Axis invasion force. Aboard the Magna Musai two Zakos squabble, but their fight is ended by the Zapper Zaku (who lacks his trademark commander fin). The Zakos are scared of Zapper due to his larger size but with a good nature chuckle he assures them he's their friend. It is an important day for Zapper, as he will be participating in a duel overseen by Commander Sazabi against Solitary Gyan. The two Zakos eagerly await in their stadium seats to see how their new friend will do. Nearby, a likewise commander fin lacking Grappler and Destroyer are also eager to see the match. Zapper entrusts his machine guns to one of two Zakos, confident he won't need them. The match begins, with Zapper easily beating back Solitary Gyan. However, Gyan resorts to dirty tricks and his own weapons to turn the battle in his favour. He mockingly suggests the Zako return Zapper's machine guns to give him a fighting chance. Much to everyone's surprise the Zako works up the courage to do so and runs to Zapper with the machine guns. An outraged Gyan strikes the Zako in the back with a missile, killing it. Zapper cradles the body of his friend and cries out in anguish. After carefully setting the body of the Zako down, Zapper grabs his machine guns and goes on a frenzied shooting rampage. A terrified Gyan attempts to surrender but Zapper refuses to show him mercy for what he has done and finishes him off with a hail of bullets. Impressed with Zapper's fighting skills, Commander Sazabi throws a commander fin at him which lands on his forehead, beginning his career as a commanding officer in the Dark Axis invasion force.

Zero
Set before the invasion of Lacroa. The Knights of Lacroa escort a carriage through desolate area of Lacroa. Rock, Battle and Nataku are suddenly possessed by an evil aura and begin to attack Zero and Deed. Working together the two knights are able to knock out their crazed friends. As they wonder to the cause of their friend's strange behaviour they soon get an answer as a giant monster appears. Zero attempts to fight it but shatters his Buster Sword in the process. As Deed watches in awe, Zero summons great power and reforms the sword, allowing him to destroy the monster. The threat defeated, the mysterious passenger of the carriage reveals herself- Princess Rele. She showers Zero with praise for his skill and power as a jealous Deed looks on.

Gundam Force Gaiden